Only Four You is the second and last studio album by the American vocal girl group Mary Jane Girls, released on February 14, 1985. As with their debut album, Mary Jane Girls, the album was produced and written by Rick James.

Background
It peaked at number 18 on the Billboard 200 chart. The album includes their biggest hit single, "In My House" (#7 Pop, #3 R&B, #1 Dance).  Other singles included "Wild and Crazy Love" (#42 Pop, #10 R&B, #3 Dance) and "Break It Up" (#79 R&B, #33 Dance). Only Four You was certified Gold by the RIAA in June 1985. Each of the other girls was also given a chance to sing lead vocals on a track from the album, with Corvette singing lead on "Girlfriend", Candi with "I Betcha" and Maxi with "Leather Queen".

Track listing
All songs written and composed by Rick James, except where noted.

"In My House" (4:28)
"Break It Up" (4:20)
"Shadow Lover (Interlude)" (:30)
"Shadow Lover" (4:22)
"Lonely for You" (4:12)
"Wild and Crazy Love" (Kenny Hawkins, Rick James) (5:48)
"Girlfriend" (4:23)
"I Betcha" (3:50)
"Leather Queen" (Rick James, Danny LeMelle) (3:50)

Personnel

Mary Jane Girls
JoJo, Candi, Corvette, Maxi: Lead & Backing Vocals

Musicians
Curtis Williams: Piano
Danny LeMelle: Sax, Synthesizers
Kenny Hawkins: Rhythm & Lead Guitar, Keyboards 
Tom McDermott: Acoustic & Electric Guitars
Rick James: Guitars, Sitar, Keyboards, Bass, Drums, Percussion
Levi Ruffin: Keyboards, String Arrangements
Gregg Levias: Keyboards, Synthesizers
Jerry Livingston: Bass
Jerry Rainey: Drums, Percussion
Nate Hughes: Percussion, Cymbals

Production
Arranged and produced by Rick James
Recorded and engineered by Bill Waldman and Bruce Kane
Mixed by Rick James and Tom Flye

References

External links
 Only Four You at Discogs

1985 albums
Mary Jane Girls albums
Albums produced by Rick James
Gordy Records albums